Hello Sunshine is an American media company founded by actress Reese Witherspoon and Strand Equity Founder and Managing Partner Seth Rodsky in 2016. Pacific Standard, the production company Witherspoon co-founded with Bruna Papandrea in 2012, is now a subsidiary of Hello Sunshine.

On July 10, 2018, its co-owner AT&T through its communications division announced the launch of a Hello Sunshine-branded cable and satellite television channel, Hello Sunshine Channel, which will be focused on women similarly to the Oprah Winfrey Network.

History
In 2000, Witherspoon founded production company Type A Films, which she merged with Bruna Papandrea's Make Movies banner to create a new production company entitled Pacific Standard in 2012. Together, they produced the Oscar-nominated films Gone Girl and Wild, and the HBO drama series Big Little Lies. In 2016, Witherspoon and Papandrea split up, with Witherspoon gaining full control over the company.

In November 2016, Witherspoon, Seth Rodsky and Otter Media formed Hello Sunshine with Sarah Harden, a joint venture focused on telling female-driven stories on film, TV and digital platforms. Pacific Standard has become a subsidiary of the newer company. The company's CEO is media and tech industry executive Kerry Tucker.
 
In addition to producing content, Hello Sunshine also curates a book club called Reese's Book Club x Hello Sunshine. Witherspoon announces a new book pick every month on her Instagram and the book club is aimed to bring women's stories forward. The book club has over 500,000 followers on Instagram, and more than 70,000 followers on Facebook. Hello Sunshine also had a Filmmaker Lab to teach 20 girls aged 13–18 the art of film making.

On social media platforms Facebook Watch and IGTV, Hello Sunshine has released three short-form unscripted series focussing on female successes. In April 2018, Hello Sunshine launched the podcast How It Is, hosted by American actress Diane Guerrero. A second season of the podcast launched in October 2018. In November 2018, the third season of How It Is premiered with Kelly McCreary taking over as host.

In July 2018, Hello Sunshine launched the talk show Shine On with Reese on DirecTV hosted by Witherspoon in her first unscripted series. The show presents one-on-one interviews between Witherspoon and various female guests focussing on how they achieved their dreams.

In October 2018, Hello Sunshine launched a new podcast titled My Best Break-Up which is hosted by Irish comedian Maeve Higgins.

In November 2018, Hello Sunshine partnered with Together Live to create the tour Hello Sunshine x Together Live. The tour went to ten different cities across the United States and featured multiple guest speakers telling their story including Halima Aden, MILCK, Yara Shahidi, Uma Thurman, Nicole Byer, Cameron Esposito, Sonequa Martin-Green and Sophia Bush. Highlights from the tour will be featured in the third forthcoming podcast And Especially You which will be hosted by guest speaker Sophia Bush.

In February 2019, Hello Sunshine received an investment from Laurene Powell Jobs' Emerson Collective. Otter Media has also increased its stake in the company.

In early August 2021, Witherspoon (after considering selling the company and hearing the interest of Apple) sold part of the company to a Blackstone backed media company, Candle Media, led by former Disney executives Kevin A. Mayer and Tom Staggs for $900 million. The transaction resulted in Witherspoon and Harden retaining a stake in the new company and a seat on the board. Hello Sunshine shut down its kids and animation unit in February 2023, with the company expected to work with fellow Candle Media subsidiary Moonbug Entertainment moving forward.

Upcoming projects
Witherspoon and Bruna Papandrea will continue to produce the projects they have in development together including Luckiest Girl Alive at Lionsgate/Summit, All Is Not Forgotten at Warner Bros, and Ashley's War at Fox 2000. They also will continue to work together under Pacific Standard's overall deal at ABC.

In May 2017, it was reported Hello Sunshine has set up to produce two novels, Eleanor Oliphant is Completely Fine by Gail Honeyman and Something in the Water by Catherine Steadman. Furthermore, it was announced that Hello Sunshine was filming a documentary about Martina Navratilova, one of the best tennis players of all time.

Hello Sunshine has acquired film rights to the novel The Gilded Years. Zendaya has signed to star in the adaption which will be called A White Lie and Witherspoon will star and produce Legally Blonde 3 which was scheduled to premiere on Valentine's Day 2020, but has since been delayed indefinitely. In November 2018, it was announced that Hello Sunshine will produce the novel League of Wives as a feature film with Fox 2000 but due to the dissolution of Fox 2000 following the acquisition of 21st Century Fox by Disney, the fate of the project is unknown as of February 2020.

As of February 2020, Hello Sunshine has six television series in development at six different networks including Apple TV+, Hulu, Amazon Prime Video, ABC, Starz and Netflix. Witherspoon will star in one show and will serve as an executive producer on all six shows.

In March 2022, it was announced that Hello Sunshine would produce Run, Rose, Run, a film adaption of a novel written by Dolly Parton and James Patterson. Parton will also star in the film.

In August 2022, the company opened in Unscripted division in the United Kingdom.

Filmography

Films

Television

Web series

Podcasts

References

External links
 
 

Film production companies of the United States
Television production companies of the United States
American companies established in 2016
Mass media companies established in 2016
2016 establishments in California
Former AT&T subsidiaries
Reese Witherspoon
Companies based in Los Angeles
Entertainment companies based in California
Privately held companies based in California
2021 mergers and acquisitions